The 2019 Pocono 400 is a Monster Energy NASCAR Cup Series race held on June 2, 2019 at Pocono Raceway in Long Pond, Pennsylvania. Contested over 160 laps on the  triangular racecourse, it was the 14th race of the 2019 Monster Energy NASCAR Cup Series season. Kyle Busch won the race, his fourth of the season and 55th career cup series win overall, tying Rusty Wallace for 9th on NASCAR's all-time Cup Series wins list.

Entry list
 (i) denotes driver who are ineligible for series driver points.
 (R) denotes rookie driver.

Practice

First practice

Final practice

Qualifying

Qualifying results

Race

Stage results

Stage One
Laps: 50

Stage Two
Laps: 50

Final stage results

Stage Three
Laps: 60

Race statistics
 Lead changes: 13 among 9 different drivers
 Cautions/Laps: 8 for 28
 Red flags: 0
 Time of race: 2 hours, 58 minutes and 9 seconds
 Average speed:

Media

Television
Fox NASCAR televised the race in the United States on FS1 for the fifth consecutive year. Mike Joy was the lap-by-lap announcer, while six-time Pocono winner, Jeff Gordon and four-time winner Darrell Waltrip were the color commentators. Jamie Little, Vince Welch and Matt Yocum reported from pit lane during the race.

Radio 
Radio coverage of the race was broadcast by Motor Racing Network (MRN) and simulcasted on Sirius XM NASCAR Radio. Alex Hayden, Jeff Striegle and four-time Pocono winner Rusty Wallace announced the race in the booth while the field was racing on the front stretch. Dave Moody called the race from atop a billboard outside of turn 1 when the field was racing through turn 1 while Mike Bagley called the race from a billboard outside turn 2 when the field was racing through turn 2. Kurt Becker reported the race from a billboard outside turn 3 when the field was racing through turn 3. Winston Kelley, Steve Post and Dillon Welch reported from pit lane during the race.

Standings after the race

Drivers' Championship standings

Manufacturers' Championship standings

Note: Only the first 16 positions are included for the driver standings.
. – Driver has clinched a position in the Monster Energy NASCAR Cup Series playoffs.

References

Pocono 400
Pocono 400
Pocono 400
NASCAR races at Pocono Raceway